Jaber Al Mutairi (born 30 September 1990) is a professional  Kuwaiti footballer. His beginnings were at the Al Tadhmon SC.

Personal life
Jaber younger brother, Talal, is also footballer.

References

1990 births
Living people
Kuwaiti footballers
Kuwait international footballers
Olympic footballers of Kuwait
Qadsia SC players
Association football forwards
Sportspeople from Kuwait City
Kuwait Premier League players
Oman Professional League players
Al Tadhamon SC players
Salalah SC players
Kuwaiti expatriate sportspeople in Oman
Kuwaiti expatriate footballers
Expatriate footballers in Oman